The men's 100 metres T36 event at the 2020 Summer Paralympics in Tokyo, took place between 3 and 4 September 2021.

Records
Prior to the competition, the existing records were as follows:

Results

Heats
Heat 1 took place on 3 September, at 20:27:

Heat 2 took place on 3 September, at 20:33:

Final
The final took place on 4 September, at 10:38:

References

Men's 100 metres T36
2021 in men's athletics